An upgrader is a facility that upgrades bitumen (extra heavy oil) into synthetic crude oil.  Upgrader plants are typically located close to oil sands production, for example, the Athabasca oil sands in  Alberta, Canada or the Orinoco tar sands in Venezuela.

Processes
Upgrading means using fractional distillation and/or chemical treatment to convert bitumen so it can be handled by oil refineries.  At a minimum, this means reducing its viscosity so that it can be pumped through pipelines (bitumen is 1000x more viscous than light crude oil). However this process often also includes separating out heavy fractions and reducing sulfur, nitrogen and metals like nickel and vanadium.

Upgrading may involve multiple processes:

Vacuum distillation to separate lighter fractions, leaving behind a residue with molecular weights over 400.
De-asphalting the vacuum distillation residue to remove the highest molecular weight alicyclic compounds, which precipitate as black/brown asphaltenes when the mixture is dissolved in C3–C7 alkanes, leaving "de-asphalted oil" (DAO) in solution. A mixture of propane and butane will remove metallic compounds that would interfere with hydrotreating.
Cracking to break long chain molecules in the DAO into shorter ones.
Hydrotreating may also be employed to remove sulfur and reduce the level of nitrogen.

Research into using biotechnology to perform some of these processes at lower temperatures and cost is ongoing.

See also
 Canadian Centre for Energy Information
 History of the petroleum industry in Canada (oil sands and heavy oil)
 Scotford Upgrader
 Syncrude
 Suncor
 Visbreaker

References

Further reading
 University of Alberta Tutorial on Upgrading of Oilsands Bitumen

Bituminous sands
Petroleum production
Petroleum technology
Industrial buildings
Chemical plants